Ronald Faria (born 2 August 1944) is a Trinidadian cricketer. He played in 52 first-class and 6 List A matches for Trinidad and Tobago from 1967 to 1979.

See also
 List of Trinidadian representative cricketers

References

External links
 

1944 births
Living people
Trinidad and Tobago cricketers